In organic chemistry, thioketones (also known as thiones or thiocarbonyls) are organosulfur compounds related to conventional ketones in which the oxygen has been replaced by a sulfur. Unhindered alkylthioketones typically tend to form polymers or rings.

Structure and bonding
The C=S bond length of thiobenzophenone is 1.63 Å, which is comparable to 1.64 Å, the C=S bond length of thioformaldehyde, measured in the gas phase. Due to steric interactions, the phenyl groups are not coplanar and the dihedral angle SC-CC is 36°.  Unhindered dialkylthiones polymerize or oligomerize but thiocamphor is well characterized red solid.

Consistent with the double bond rule, most alkyl thioketones are unstable with respect to dimerization. The energy difference between the p orbitals of sulfur and carbon is greater than that between oxygen and carbon in ketones. The relative difference in energy and diffusity of the atomic orbitals of sulfur compared to carbon results in poor overlap of the orbitals and the energy gap between the HOMO and LUMO is thus reduced for C=S relative to C=O. The striking blue appearance of thiobenzophenone is attributed to π→ π* transitions upon the absorption of red light.  Thiocamphor is red.

Preparative methods
Thiones are usually prepared from ketones using reagents that exchange S and O atoms. A common reagent is phosphorus pentasulfide and the related reagent Lawesson's reagent. Other methods uses a mixture of hydrogen chloride combined with hydrogen sulfide. Bis(trimethylsilyl)sulfide has also been employed.

Thiobenzophenone [(C6H5)2CS] is a stable deep blue compound that dissolves readily in organic solvents. It photooxidizes in air to benzophenone and sulfur. Since its discovery, a variety of related thiones have been prepared.

Thiosulfines
Thiosulfines, also called thiocarbonyl S-sulfides, are compounds with the formula R2CSS. Although superficially appearing to be cumulenes, with the linkage R2C=S=S, they are more usefully classified as 1,3-dipoles and indeed participate in 1,3-dipolar cycloadditions. Thiosulfines are proposed to exist in equilibrium with dithiiranes, three-membered CS2 rings. Thiosulfines are often invoked as intermediates in mechanistic discussions of the chemistry of thiones. For example, thiobenzophenone decomposes upon oxidation to the 1,2,4-trithiolane (Ph2C)2S3, which arises via the cycloaddition of Ph2CSS to its parent Ph2CS.

See also
Thial, for a description of thioaldehydes.
Thioketene
Thioacetone

References

External links and further reading
 Definition of Selones in the IUPAC Gold Book
 

 
Functional groups